Sandra Fruean Herrera (born 23 August 1968) is a football official and a former footballer from American Samoa. Since September 2016, she has been a member of the FIFA Council. She also is the current Vice President of the Football Federation American Samoa.

Playing career
Fruean is a former national team player of American Samoa. She represented American Samoa in the 1998 OFC qualifier for the FIFA Women's World Cup. Two of her children are also former American Samoa national players, daughter Sandra Ivette Fruean-Sopoaga, and son, Ismael D'Angelo Herrera.
Fruean has attended the FIFA Women's World Cup in Germany and has been a member of the FIFA U-17 Women's World Cup since 2012.

References

External links
 Sandra Fruean's long soccer journey to the top

1968 births
Living people
American Samoan women's footballers
American Samoa women's international footballers
FIFA officials
Women's association footballers not categorized by position
21st-century American women